Morriston Rugby Football Club is a rugby union team from the village of Morriston, Swansea in West Wales. The club is a member of the Welsh Rugby Union and is a feeder club for the Ospreys.

The club was founded in 1876 and has produced a number of established Welsh internationals, such as Paul Moriarty, Richard Moriarty, Ross Moriarty. 
They were the first Club to win the Swalec bowl in 2009.

Club badge
The club badge is a shield split into three sections. Each third holds a symbol representing the club and the community, which are St John's Church, Castle Craig and the Prince of Wales's feathers.

Club honours
 WRU Division Four West
Winners - 2008
 SWALEC Bowl
Winners 2008/09
 WRU Division 3 West Central C
Runners-Up 2014/15
 WRU Division 3 West Central A
Runners-Up 2015/16
 Brains SA Plate
Runners-Up 2014–15, 2015–16
 Glamorgan County Silver Ball
Semi Finalist 2014-15

Notable former players
  William Richard Arnold
  Tom Deacon
  Will Joseph
  Fred Jowett
  Harry Payne
  Bob Thomas
 Richard Moriarty
 Paul Moriarty
 Tony Clements
 Ross Moriarty

References 

Welsh rugby union teams
Rugby clubs established in 1876
Rugby union in Swansea
1876 establishments in Wales